Eastgate House (also known as Heron House) is a high-rise office building on the corner of Newport Road and City Road, Cardiff, Wales, next to Longcross Court and near Holland House. It is (or has been) occupied by the Wales Office, Department for Work and Pensions, Cardiff University, Newsco Insider, Biofusion Plc, BPP Professional, Asthma UK and Randstad Holding. The office building contains 3 elevators and has parking space for 40 cars.

Eastgate House was purchased in 2015 by private equity firm Maya Capital, for £7 million.

References

External links
Official website

Office buildings in Cardiff
Economy of Cardiff
Department for Work and Pensions
Government buildings completed in 1969
1969 establishments in Wales
Government buildings in Wales